Fay Okell Bainter (December 7, 1893 – April 16, 1968) was an American film and stage actress. She won the Academy Award for Best Supporting Actress for Jezebel (1938) and has a star on the Hollywood Walk of Fame.

Early life

Bainter was born in Los Angeles, California, the daughter of Charles F. Bainter and Mary Okell.

Career

Bainter made her first appearance on stage in 1908 in The County Chairman at Morosco's Theater in Burbank, California.  In 1910, she was a traveling stage actress. Her Broadway debut was in the role of Celine Marinter in The Rose of Panama (1912). P. G. Wodehouse, reviewing Turn to the Right in Vanity Fair in 1916, wrote, "Miss Bainter's advent from nowhere and her instant success form the season's biggest sensation." She appeared in a number of successful plays in New York, such as East Is West, The Willow Tree, and Dodsworth. In 1926, she appeared with Walter Abel in a Broadway production of Channing Pollock's The Enemy. MGM persuaded her to try films and her movie debut was in This Side of Heaven (February 1934). Also in 1934, she appeared in Dodsworth on Broadway and in the film It Happened One Day. Bainter quickly achieved success in the movies, and in 1938 she became the first performer nominated in the same year for both the Academy Award for Best Actress for White Banners (1938) and the Academy Award for Best Supporting Actress for Jezebel (1938), winning for the latter. In 1940, she played Mrs. Gibbs in the film production of the Thornton Wilder play Our Town. In 1945, she played Melissa Frake in the Rodgers and Hammerstein musical State Fair. She was again nominated for Best Supporting Actress for her role in The Children's Hour (1961). 

Bainter has a star on the Hollywood Walk of Fame at 7021 Hollywood Boulevard in Los Angeles, California.

Personal life
Fay Bainter and Reginald Venable were married on June 8, 1921, in Riverside, California. Cmdr. Reginald Venable was a United States Navy officer who graduated from the US Naval Academy in 1913. He resigned from the Navy in 1925 as a Lieutenant Commander to manage his wife's business affairs. He had been a real-estate operator. The couple had one son, Reginald Venable Jr., who became an actor. 

Bainter was the aunt of actress Dorothy Burgess. 

Bainter and Venable are interred at Arlington National Cemetery.

Filmography

Radio appearances

See also

 List of actors with Academy Award nominations
 List of actors with Hollywood Walk of Fame motion picture stars

References

Further reading

External links

 
 
 
 Fay Bainter and son Reggie Jr.
 Fay Bainter at Virtual History

1893 births
1968 deaths
20th-century American actresses
Actresses from Los Angeles
American film actresses
American stage actresses
Best Supporting Actress Academy Award winners
Burials at Arlington National Cemetery
Deaths from pneumonia in California
Metro-Goldwyn-Mayer contract players